Gaston College is a public community college in Dallas, North Carolina. Serving Gaston County and Lincoln County, Gaston College enrolls over 5,000 students each term in curriculum programs and about 16,000 students in continuing education programs. It is part of the North Carolina Community College System and accredited by the Southern Association of Colleges and Schools to award associate degrees.

History 
Gaston College was granted a charter by the State of North Carolina in 1963 and began its first classes in temporary headquarters in September 1964.  The college moved to its permanent campus on Highway 321 between Dallas and Gastonia two months later. The college opened with a single campus and has since expanded to three campuses serving approximately 20,000 students each year through over 100 programs leading to degrees, diplomas and certificates.

Campus locations 
Gaston College has three campuses and one regional training center:
 Dallas Campus - (Main Campus) Dallas, Gaston County
There is an efficient road system and parking for more than 2,000 cars. College facilities are available for public use. Gaston College is a commuter institution and does not have dormitories or housing for rent. As of Fall 2019, the Dallas Campus does not have any permanent restaurant options.
 Lincoln Campus - Lincolnton, Lincoln County
The Lincoln Center of Gaston College was opened in August 1969.  In 1987, it was relocated to the Lincoln County School of Technology in Lincolnton.  The former Lincolnton High School was renovated by Gaston College to become the current Lincoln County Location.  Classes were first held at Lincoln Campus in Spring 1999.  The second Lincoln Campus building, Cochrane Science and Technology Building, was completed in January 2009. The lower level expansion was completed fall of 2011. The school of cosmetology became operational January 2012.
 Kimbrell Campus and Textile Technology Center - Belmont, Gaston County
 
The North Carolina Vocational Textile School was approved in 1941 and began operation in 1943 in Belmont.  It was later renamed the North Carolina Center for Applied Textile Technology.  In 2005, the center was transferred to Gaston College and became the East Campus and Textile Technology Center.  The Textile Technology Center offers new and sample product development, product testing, training, and consulting for the textile industry.  Currently numerous continuing education and a few curriculum classes are offered on the campus.
 Regional Emergency Services Training Center - (Main Campus) Dallas, Gaston County
The Regional Emergency Services Training Center is a five-story training facility used by fire, police, and emergency medical organizations.  On surrounding grounds, there are nine propane and flammable liquids pits.  The center gives Gaston College the opportunity to offer specialized training previously unavailable in the region.

References

External links 
 Official website

Universities and colleges accredited by the Southern Association of Colleges and Schools
Two-year colleges in the United States
North Carolina Community College System colleges
Education in Gaston County, North Carolina
Education in Lincoln County, North Carolina
Buildings and structures in Gaston County, North Carolina
Buildings and structures in Lincoln County, North Carolina
Educational institutions established in 1963
1963 establishments in North Carolina